Talnakh was a town located about  north of Norilsk at the foot of the Putoran Mountains in Taymyr Peninsula, Krasnoyarsk Krai, Russia. In 2005 the town was merged into Norilsk. Population: 

It is the site of the mines serving the production of nickel and other metals in Norilsk's metallurgical industry. The mineral talnakhite is named after Talnakh.

See also
 Northernmost settlements

References

Geography of Krasnoyarsk Krai
Populated places of Arctic Russia
Road-inaccessible communities of Krasnoyarsk Krai
Socialist planned cities